Auglandslia is a neighbourhood in the city of Kristiansand in Agder county, Norway.  The neighborhood is located in the borough of Vågsbygd and in the district of Vågsbygd.  It is located north of Augland, west of Skyllingsheia, and south of Granlia and Fiskåtangen.

References

Geography of Kristiansand
Neighbourhoods of Kristiansand